The Krall Crags are two rock summits rising to over  on the northwestern slope of Mount Erebus, Ross Island, Antarctica. The crags were named by the Advisory Committee on Antarctic Names (2000), at the suggestion of P.R. Kyle, after Sarah Krall who worked for more than over 10 years in providing support to science in Antarctica. She was cook and camp manager at the Lower Erebus Hut during the 1992–93 National Science Foundation – NASA Dante robot experiment on Mount Erebus; she also managed the food room at McMurdo Station, was the hovercraft pilot, and has also been a helicopter technician.

References

Cliffs of Ross Island